Jerramy Francis Dinsay King is a Filipino-American professional basketball player who last played for the NorthPort Batang Pier of the Philippine Basketball Association (PBA).

In October 2015, King was signed by the Pacquiao Powervit Pilipinas Aguilas (now the Pilipinas MX3 Kings) where he was one of the two Heritage Import, the other being Alli Austria.

References

External links
Long Beach State 49ers bio
College stats @ sports-reference.com

1990 births
Living people
American men's basketball players
American sportspeople of Filipino descent
ASEAN Basketball League players
Basketball players from California
Cal State East Bay Pioneers men's basketball players
Filipino men's basketball players
Long Beach State Beach men's basketball players
NLEX Road Warriors draft picks
NorthPort Batang Pier players
People from La Cañada Flintridge, California
Point guards
Rain or Shine Elasto Painters players
Terrafirma Dyip players
Citizens of the Philippines through descent